The 2017–18 Western Football League season (known as the 2017–18 Toolstation Western Football League for sponsorship reasons) was the 116th in the history of the Western Football League, a football competition in England. Teams are divided into two divisions; the Premier and the First.

The constitution was announced on 26 May 2017.

Premier Division
The Premier Division consisted of 20 clubs, the same as last season, and featured three new clubs after Bristol Manor Farm were promoted to Southern League Division One South & West, Gillingham Town resigned from the league, and Sherborne Town were relegated to the Division One.

Bridgwater Town, relegated from the Southern League Division One South & West.
Hengrove Athletic, runners-up in the Division One.
Wellington, champions of the Division One.

With the suspension of ground grading Grade E for this season and the creation of a new league at Steps 3 and 4, the champions of all Step 5 leagues were compulsorily promoted to Step 4. Of the fourteen runners-up, the twelve clubs with the best PPG (points per game ratio) were also to be compulsorily promoted, but with resignations and mergers in leagues above, all runners-up were promoted.

Teams at Step 5 without ground grading Grade F were to be relegated to Step 6, but no club in this division failed the ground grading process. All Step 5 leagues were fixed at 20 clubs for 2018–19, but in this case there were no further relegations or reprieves.

League table

Stadia and locations

First Division
The First Division consisted of 22 clubs, the same as the previous season, and featured two new clubs after the promotion of Hengrove Athletic and Wellington to the Premier Division:

Bristol Telephones, promoted from the Gloucestershire County League.
Sherborne Town, relegated from the Premier Division.

Step 6 clubs without ground grading Grade G were to be relegated to Step 7, but no club in this division failed the ground grading process. All Step 6 leagues were fixed at a maximum of 20 clubs for 2018–19, but in this case there were no further relegations or reprieves.

League table

Stadia and locations

References
 League tables

External links
 Western League Official Site

2017-18
9